This is a list of American grunge bands. It includes rock bands and solo artists formed in the USA whose primary genre is grunge or either they have or had the elements of it in their music style. Grunge music is a subgenre of alternative rock that emerged during the mid-1980s in the American state of Washington, particularly in the Seattle area. Inspired by hardcore punk, heavy metal, and indie rock, grunge is generally characterized by heavily distorted electric guitars, contrasting song dynamics, and apathetic or angst-filled lyrics. The grunge aesthetic is stripped-down compared to other forms of rock music, and many grunge musicians were noted for their unkempt appearances and rejection of theatrics.

#

A

B

C

D

E

F

G

H

J

L

M

N

P

S

T

V

W

See also

 Grunge
 List of grunge albums
 Alternative rock
 Alternative metal
 Post-grunge
 List of alternative rock artists
 List of alternative metal artists

External links
 Grunge Artists Highlights at AllMusic

References

 
 
American grunge
American grunge